The Apartment Complex is a 1999 American made-for-television mystery-thriller film directed by Tobe Hooper.

Plot
The film involves a man named Stan who becomes the manager of an apartment complex with strange tenants, after the previous manager disappears under mysterious circumstances. Things go downhill after he discovers a corpse in the complex's pool and is accused of murder. More bizarre events occur until he finds his life (and his sanity) in danger, and the tenants just may be his only hope.

Cast
 Chad Lowe as Stan Warden
 Fay Masterson as Alice
 Obba Babatundé as Chett
 Patrick Warburton as Morgan
 Amanda Plummer as Miss Chenille
 Ron Canada as Detective Culver
 Miguel Sandoval as Detective Duarte
 Jon Polito as Dr. Caligari
 R. Lee Ermey as Frank Stanton
 Charles Martin Smith as Gary Glumley

Critical reception
Variety gave the film a favorable review, writing, "not a scarefest by any stretch but creepy enough to sustain the interest of most viewers, this nod to The Twilight Zone cleverly winks its way out of some pretty silly situations. [...] ...director Tobe Hooper [...] earns points for constructing real tension and genuine thrills."

References

External links
 

1999 television films
1999 films
Films directed by Tobe Hooper
Films set in apartment buildings
American mystery thriller films
American thriller television films
1990s mystery thriller films
1990s English-language films
1990s American films